Tupraq Qaleh (also Romanized as Tūprāq Qal‘eh and Towprāq Qal‘eh) is a village in Bash Qaleh Rural District of the Central District of Urmia County, West Azerbaijan province, Iran. At the 2006 National Census, its population was 1,831 in 476 households. The following census in 2011 counted 2,131 people in 628 households. The latest census in 2016 showed a population of 2,467 people in 741 households; it was the largest village in its rural district.

References 

Urmia County

Populated places in West Azerbaijan Province

Populated places in Urmia County